Incilius mazatlanensis (common name: Sinaloa toad) is a species of toad in the family Bufonidae. It is endemic to Mexico and found in the Pacific coastal plain and slopes from southwestern Chihuahua and northern Sonora south to Colima.

Its natural habitats are tropical deciduous and semi-deciduous forests, riparian environments, and lowland pine forests. It is a common species. It is not threatened although it can be locally impacted by desiccation of water systems.

References

mazatlanensis
Endemic amphibians of Mexico
Amphibians described in 1940
Taxa named by Edward Harrison Taylor
Taxonomy articles created by Polbot
Sonoran Desert
Sonoran–Sinaloan transition subtropical dry forest
Sinaloan dry forests
Jalisco dry forests